The Zenevisi or Zenebishi ( 1304–1460) were a medieval Albanian noble family. They governed territories in Epirus, and were centered in Gjirokastër.

John Zenevisi was one of the most notable members of this family. Between 1373 and 1414 he controlled Gjirokastër and its surroundings. After the Ottomans captured the region of Epirus, some members of the family fled to Morea, while other members held high positions within Ottoman hierarchy.

History

Early History 

The "Zenevias", probably the Zenevisi, are mentioned in 1304 as one of the families that were granted privileges by the Angevin Philip I, Prince of Taranto. According to Robert Elsie, the family originated from the Zagoria region between Gjirokastër and Përmet, in modern-day southern Albania.

In 1381 and 1384, the Catholic lords of Arta asked the Ottoman troops for protection against the invading Albanians under the Zenevisi; the Ottomans routed the raiders and restored order in Epirus.

John Zenevisi is one of the most notable members of this family. Like many contemporary Balkan rulers who were under the cultural influence of the Byzantine Empire, he adopted a title from the Byzantine court hierarchy for himself, that of sevastokrator.

In 1399, during the battle of Mesopotamos, the Zenevisi defeated the army of Esau Buondelmonti. The Zenevisi captured the archontes of Ioannina and took Esau Buondelmonti as hostage. This victory would mark the heyday of the Zenevisi clan, which would last until 1418. During which, the Zenevisi clan annexed Saiata, Dryïnoupolis and made Gjirokastër the capital of their territory.
During the Ottoman Interregnum (1402–13) Zenevisi lost territory to the Republic of Venice; most of the mainland territories across from the Venetian possession of Corfu were taken.

Ottoman period 
Members of this family (as well as of the Arianiti and Muzaka clan) that initially resisted Ottoman expansion converted to Islam, while some of them rose to high positions within the Ottoman military and feudal hierarchy. The Ottomans besieged and took control of Gjirokaster, the capital of the Zenevisi lands, in 1418, and John Zenevisi was killed in 1418 or 1419 by the Ottomans. The territory that the Zenevisi controlled before their submission to the Ottomans was registered in an Ottoman defter (tax register) of 1431 as "the lands of Zenevisi".
After the annexation of their territories by the Ottomans, the remaining members of the Zenevesi clan emigrated to Morea.

In 1443 Simon Zenevisi, John's grandson, built the Strovili fortress with Venetian approval and support. In 1454–55 Simon Zenevisi was recognized by Alphonso V as a vassal of the Kingdom of Naples.

John's son, known after his conversion to Islam as Hasan Bey, was a subaşi in Tetovo in 1455. The other son of John, whose Muslim name was Hamza Zenevisi, was an Ottoman military commander who defeated the forces of the Despots of the Morea besieging Patras in 1459. In 1460, following the Ottoman conquest of the Morea, he became a sanjakbey of the Sanjak of Mezistre.

Members 
John Zenevisi had the following descendants:

 A1. Anna ("Kyrianna"), Lady of Grabossa; married Andrea III Musachi (fl. 1419)
 A2. Maria, +after 1419; married Perotto d'Altavilla, the Baron of Corfu (+1445)
 A3. Thopia Zenevisi (d. 1435), Lord of Argyrokastron (1418–34), deposed by the Ottomans
 B1. Simone Zenevisi, Lord of the Strovilo (1443–61), deposed by the Ottomans
 C1. Alfonso (fl. 1456), an Ottoman political hostage who fled to Naples and became a Napolitan vassal
 C2. Alessandro ("Lech"), Lord of Strovilo which he then sold to Venice in 1473
 C3. Filippo, served Alessandro
 A4. Hamza Zenevisi ("Amos", fl. 1456-60), an Ottoman political hostage, he was converted into Islam and entered Ottoman service. In 1460 he became a sanjakbey of the Sanjak of Mezistre.
 A5. Hasan Zenevisi, subaşi in Tetovo in 1455.

References

Sources 

Zenevisi family